Brigadeiro Protásio de Oliveira Airport , formerly called Júlio César Airport, was an airport serving Belém, Brazil. Since 14 April 2010, it was named after Protásio Lopes de Oliveira (1923–2003) former president of Infraero and commander of the 1st Regional Air Force (I COMAR).

It was operated by Infraero.

History
The airport was opened in 1936 as a military airfield. In 1937 the Flying School of Pará also established itself on the premises. The airport remained dedicated to military and instruction operations until 1976, when it was converted for public use with the name of Júlio César Airport, after the neighborhood where it is located.

In 1980 administration was transferred to Infraero and it was dedicated to general aviation.

On 4 March 2021 plans to close the airport were announced. The site was converted into a park and its general aviation operations were transferred to Val-de-Cans International Airport. The airport was closed on 31 December 2021. 

At the time of its closure no scheduled flights operated at this airport.

Access

See also

References

External links

Defunct airports in Brazil
Airports established in 1936
Airports disestablished in 2021
2021 disestablishments in Brazil
Buildings and structures in Belém